Florence Lascelles, Countess of Harewood (12 Feb 1859 – 5 May 1943), was the wife of Henry Lascelles, 5th Earl of Harewood and mother of Henry Lascelles, 6th Earl of Harewood who married Mary, Princess Royal, the only daughter of King George V.

Born Lady Florence Katharine Bridgeman, youngest daughter of Orlando Bridgeman, 3rd Earl of Bradford and his wife, the former Selina Weld-Forester, she grew up at Weston Park. She married the future earl, Viscount Lascelles, on 5 November 1881 at St Peter's Church, Eaton Square, London. They lived at Goldsborough Hall until 1892 when her husband inherited his father's earldom and they moved to Harewood House. 

The couple had three children:

Henry Lascelles, 6th Earl of Harewood (1882–1947), who married Mary, Princess Royal and had two sons, who were, at the time of their birth, 6th and 7th in line of succession to the British throne 
Lady Margaret Selina Lascelles (1883–1978), who married Gustavus Hamilton-Russell, 9th Viscount Boyne and had children
Major Edward Cecil Lascelles (1887–1935), who married Joan Balfour, a granddaughter of George Campbell, 8th Duke of Argyll.

The countess was appointed a Dame of Justice of the Order of St John of Jerusalem.  She died on 5 May 1943 at Burwarton House, Bridgnorth, Shropshire, the family home of her daughter Margaret, Viscountess Boyne.

In 2017, Harewood House held an exhibition of photographs taken by the countess, a keen amateur photographer.

Arms

References

1859 births
1943 deaths
Florence
British countesses
Daughters of British earls